Gonnabattula Kanakaraju Chiranjeevi (born 18 June 1992) is an Indian cricketer who represents Puducherry in domestic cricket.

References

External links
 

1992 births
Living people
Indian cricketers
Andhra cricketers
Cricketers from Vijayawada
Pondicherry cricketers